The Oceanport Stakes is an American Thoroughbred horse race run annually in early August at Monmouth Park Racetrack in Oceanport, New Jersey. Open to horses age three and older, the Grade III event is contested on turf over a distance of  miles(8.5 furlongs). 

Inaugurated in 1947 as a six furlong sprint race on dirt, it was switched to the turf course in 1964.

The race was not run in 1996 due to Hurricane Bertha. It was run in two divisions in 1956, 1966–1969, 1971, 1973, 1975–1976, 1979, 1982.

Records
Speed  record:
 1:38.99 - Silent Roar (2007)

Winners since 1999

Earlier winners

 1998 - Daylight Savings (4)
 1997 - Boyce (6)
 1996 - not run
 1995 - Boyce (4)
 1994 - Nijinksy's Gold (5)
 1993 - Furiously (4)
 1992 - Maxigroom (4)
 1991 - Fiftysevenvette (4)
 1990 - Bill E. Shears (5)
 1989 - Yankee Affair (7)
 1988 - Feeling Gallant (6)
 1987 - Sovereign Song (5)
 1986 - Salem Drive (4)
 1985 - Cozzene (5)
 1984 - World Appeal (4)
 1983 - Fray Star (5)
 1982 - McCann (4)
 1981 - Winds of Winter (4)
 1980 - North Course (5)
 1979 - Revivalist (5)
 1978 - Mr. Red Wing (4)
 1977 - Quick Card (4)
 1976 - Toujours Pret (7)
 1975 - R Tom Can (4)
 1974 - Mo Bay (5)
 1973 - Lexington Park (7)
 1972 - Native Heir (6)
 1971 - Red Reality (5)
 1970 - Mr. Leader (4)
 1969 - Mara Lark (4)
 1968 - Country Friend (6)
 1967 - not run
 1966 - not run
 1965 - Uncle Percy (7)
 1964 - Turbo Jet (4)
 1963 - Accordant (3)
 1962 - Jet's Pat (4)
 1961 - Careless John (4)
 1960 - Besomer (7)
 1959 - Itobe (6)
 1958 - True Verdict (4)
 1957 - Decathlon
 1956 - Duc De Fer (5)
 1956 - Decathlon (2nd div.)
 1955 - Dark Peter (7)
 1954 - Master Ace (5)
 1953 - Cinda (4)
 1952 - General Staff (4)
 1951 - Tuscany (3)
 1950 - Imacomin (4)
 1949 - Rippey (6)
 1948 - Yankee Hill (4)
 1947 - Polynesian (5)

References
Oceanport Stakes at pedigree query

Monmouth Park Racetrack
Graded stakes races in the United States
Horse races in New Jersey
Turf races in the United States
Open mile category horse races
Recurring sporting events established in 1947
1947 establishments in New Jersey